There were three elections for the leadership of the New Zealand National Party in 2020:
 the May 2020 New Zealand National Party leadership election, in which Simon Bridges was replaced by Todd Muller
 the July 2020 New Zealand National Party leadership election, in which Muller was replaced by Judith Collins
 the November 2020 New Zealand National Party deputy leadership election, in which Collins retained leadership but Gerry Brownlee was replaced as deputy by Shane Reti.